In phonology, minimal pairs are pairs of words or phrases in a particular language, spoken or signed, that differ in only one phonological element, such as a phoneme, toneme or chroneme, and have distinct meanings. They are used to demonstrate that two phones represent two separate phonemes in the language.

Many phonologists in the middle part of the 20th century had a strong interest in developing techniques for discovering the phonemes of unknown languages, and in some cases, they set up writing systems for the languages. The major work of Kenneth Pike on the subject is Phonemics: a technique for reducing languages to writing. The minimal pair was an essential tool in the discovery process and was found by substitution or commutation tests.

An example for English consonants is the minimal pair of "pat" + "bat". The following table shows other pairs demonstrating the existence of various distinct phonemes in English. All of the possible minimal pairs for any language may be set out in the same way.

Phonemic differentiation may vary between different dialects of a language so a particular minimal pair in one accent may be a pair of homophones in another. That means not that one of the phonemes is absent in the homonym accent but only that it is not contrastive in the same range of contexts.

Types
In addition to the minimal pairs of vowels and consonants provided above, others may be found:

Quantity
Many languages show contrasts between long and short vowels and consonants. A distinctive difference in length is attributed by some phonologists to a unit called a chroneme. Thus, Italian has the following minimal pair that is based on long and short :

However, in such a case it is not easy to decide whether a long vowel or consonant should be treated as having an added chroneme or simply as a geminate sound with phonemes.

Classical Latin, German, some Italian dialects, almost all Uralic languages, Thai, and many other languages also have distinctive length in vowels. An example is the cŭ/cū minimal pair in the dialect that is spoken near Palmi (Calabria, Italy):

Syntactic gemination
In some languages like Italian, word-initial consonants are geminated after certain vowel-final words in the same prosodic unit. Sometimes, the phenomenon can create some syntactic-gemination-minimal-pairs:

In the example, the graphical accent on dà is just a diacritical mark that does not change the pronunciation of the word itself. However, in some specific areas, like Tuscany, both phrases are pronounced  and so can be distinguished only from the context.

Tone
Minimal pairs for tone contrasts in tone languages can be established; some writers refer to that as a contrast involving a toneme. For example, Kono distinguishes high tone and low tone on syllables:

Stress
Languages in which stress may occur in different positions within the word often have contrasts that can be shown in minimal pairs, as in Greek and Spanish:

In certain cases it can also differentiate two words: below  vs billow .

Juncture
Anglophones can distinguish between, for example, "great ape" and "grey tape", but phonemically, the two phrases are identical: . The difference between the two phrases, which constitute a minimal pair, is said to be one of juncture.

Only languages with allophonic differences associated with grammatical boundaries may have juncture as a phonological element. There is disagreement over whether or not French has phonological juncture: it seems likely that the difference between, for example, "" (some little holes) and "" (some little wheels), phonemically both , is only perceptible in slow, careful speech.

Minimal sets
The principle of a simple binary opposition between the two members of a minimal pair may be extended to cover a minimal set in which a number of words differ from one another in terms of one phone in a particular position in the word.
pata 'hinge', peta 'bend', pita 'pass', pota 'twist', puta 'thrash'. However, establishing such sets is not always straightforward and may require very complex study of multiple oppositions as expounded by, for example, Nikolai Trubetzkoy.

Teaching
Minimal pairs were an important part of the theory of pronunciation teaching during its development in the period of structuralist linguistics, particularly in the 1940s and 1950s, and minimal pair drills were widely used to train students to discriminate among the phonemes of the target language.  These drills took the form of minimal pair word drills and minimal pair sentence drills. For example, if the focus of a lesson was on the distinction /ɪ/ versus /ɛ/, learners might be asked to signal which sound they heard as the teacher pronounced lists of words with these phonemes such as lid/led, tin/ten, or slipped/slept. Minimal pair sentence drills consisted of paired sentences such as "He slipped on the floor/He slept on the floor." Again, learners would be asked to distinguish which of the sentences they heard as the teacher read them aloud. Another use of minimal pair drills was in pair work. Here, one member of the pair would be responsible for listening to the other member read the minimal pair word or sentence aloud and would be tasked with identifying which phoneme was being produced. In this form of classroom practice, both the skills of perception and production were practiced. Later writers have criticized the approach as being artificial and lacking in relevance to language learners' needs. However, even today minimal pair listening and production drills remain a common tool for the teaching of segmental differences.

Some writers have claimed that learners are likely not to hear differences between phones if the difference is not a phonemic one. One of the objectives of contrastive analysis of languages' sound systems was to identify points of likely difficulty for language learners that would arise from differences in phoneme inventories between the native language and the target language. However, experimental evidence for this claim is hard to find, and the claim should be treated with caution.

In sign languages 
In the past, signs were considered holistic forms without internal structure. However, the discovery in the mid-20th century that minimal pairs also exist in sign languages showed that sign languages have sublexical structure. Signs consist of phonemes, which are specifications for location, movement, handshape, orientation, and non-manual elements. When signs differ in only one of these specifications, they form a minimal pair. For instance, the German Sign Language signs shoes and socks are identical in form apart from their handshapes.

See also
 Minimal pairs in Phoneme

References

Bibliography

Brown, G. (1990) Listening to Spoken English, Longman
Celce-Murcia, M., D. Brinton and J. Goodwin (1996) Teaching Pronunciation, Cambridge University Press
Fromkin, V. and Rodman, R. (1993) An Introduction to Language, Harcourt Brace Jovanovich
Jones, Daniel (1931) ' "" ' ['The "Word" as a phonetic entity'], Le Maître Phonétique, XXXVI, pp. 60–65. 
Jones, Daniel (1944) 'Chronemes and Tonemes', Acta Linguistica, IV, Copenhagen, pp. 1–10.
Ladefoged, Peter (2001) Vowels and Consonants, Blackwell
Ladefoged, Peter (2006) A Course in Phonetics, Thomson
Lado, R. (1957) Linguistics across Cultures, University of Michigan Press
Lado, R. (1961) Language Testing, Longman
O'Connor, J.D. (1973) Phonetics, Penguin
O'Connor, J.D and Tooley, O. (1964) 'The perceptibility of certain word-boundaries', in Abercrombie et al. (eds) In Honour of Daniel Jones, Longman, pp. 171–6.
Pennington, M. (1996) Phonology in English Language Teaching, Longman
Pike, Kenneth (1947) Phonemics, University of Michigan Press
Roach, Peter (2009) English Phonetics and Phonology, Cambridge University Press
Swadesh, M. (1934) 'The Phonemic Principle', Language vol. 10, pp. 117–29
Trubetzkoy, N., translated by C. Baltaxe(1969) Principles of Phonology, University of California Press

External links
 Complete List of Minimal pairs for English RP (Received Pronunciation)

Phonology